Ditipriya Roy is an Indian television and film actress working in Bengali-language films and serials. She is known for portraying the character of Rani Rashmoni in the Bengali television series Karunamoyee Rani Rashmoni. Her movies include Avijatrik,Bob Biswas, Aay Khuku Aay, Kolkata Chalantika  and Achena Uttam.

Career 
Ditipriya started her career in television as a child artist and acted in serials like Maa, Durga, Aparajito, Byomkesh, Bamakhyapa, Tomay Amay Mile, Tare Ami Chokhe Dekhini. In 2015 she acted in Rajkahini, directed by Srijit Mukherji. In 2017 she played the protagonist role in Bengali television series Karunamoyee Rani Rashmoni. The series was aired on Zee Bangla and  completed more than 1,000 episodes. She has made her Bollywood debut in Bob Biswas.

Television

Guest appearances

Reality show

Mahalaya

Filmography
{| class="wikitable"
|+
!Year
!Film
!Role
!Director
!Language
!Ref
|-
|2015
|Rajkahini
|Buchki
|Srijit Mukherji
|Bengali
|
|-
|2016
|Dev: I Love You
|Chaapa
|Abhimanyu Mukherjee
|Bengali
|
|-
|2021
|Avijatrik
|Aparna
|Subhrajit Mitra
|Bengali
|
|-
|2021
|Bob Biswas
|Tina 
|Diya Annapurna Ghosh
|Hindi
|
|-
|2022
|Aay Khuku Aay
|Satabdi/Buri
|Sauvik Kundu 
|Bengali 
|
|-
|2022
|Achena Uttam 
|Sabitri Chatterjee
|Atanu Bose
|Bengali
|
|-
|2022
| Kolkata Chalantika(Film) |Kolkata Chalantika| Ador Mukherjee
|Pavel
|Bengali
|
|}

 Web series 

Music videos

Personal life
Her father Aloke Shankar Roy is a veterinary doctor and actor. Ditipriya passed Higher secondary examination in 2020 with 82.4% marks.

Currently she is a student in the department of sociology at Asutosh College.

 Awards 
Roy has received the following awards:
 
 
 Bochorer Sera Award - from Governor of West Bengal organized by'' ABP Digital (2021)
 Best child actress (Tele Somman)
 Best actress - Zee Bangla (2018, 2020, 2021)
 Best child actress - Tele Academy (2018)
 Best Actress - Tele Academy (2019)
 Best Actress - Tele Cine (2019)
 Best Actress (Television) - Anandalok Purashkar (2022)

References

External links 
 

Living people
Bengali television actresses
Actresses from Kolkata
21st-century Indian actresses
Year of birth missing (living people)